Prince Joseph Ernst Friedrich Karl Anton Meinrad of Hohenzollern-Sigmaringen (24 May 1702 in Sigmaringen – 8 December 1769 at Haag Castle, Haigerloch) was the fifth Prince of Hohenzollern-Sigmaringen. He ruled from 1715 to 1769.

Life 
Joseph was the eldest son of Prince Meinrad II of Hohenzollern-Sigmaringen (1673–1715) from his marriage to Johanna Katharina von Montfort (1678–1759), daughter of Count Johann Anton I of Montfort-Tettnang.

He was initially raised by his mother.  However, due to the turmoil of the War of the Spanish Succession, the family moved to his father's residence in Vienna.  Joseph continued to be educated in Vienna after his parents returned to Sigmaringen in 1714.  After his father's death in 1715, he succeeded as Prince of Hohenzollern-Sigmaringen.  However, as he was still a minor, he stood under his mother's regency until 1720.  Shortly before 1720, Joseph joined the Austrian army, where he held the rank of General of the Cavalry and later Fieldmarshal Lieutenant of the imperial Swabian Circle.

Joseph managed to befriend the Electorate of Bavaria and after the election, Emperor Charles VII appointed him as imperial Geheimrat.

Joseph was an avid hunter and in 1727, he created the game park Josefslust in Sigmaringen.  In 1736, he modernized and remodeled Sigmaringen Castle.  He also embellished the local Knight's Hall and added portraits of all his ancestors.  In Sigmaringen, he built the St Johann's Church, the St. Joseph Chapel, and the Jagdschloss in Josefslust Park.  In Haigerloch, which he preferred as a residence over Sigmaringen, he built the St Anna's Church.

He was known as a patron of the arts.  He commissioned works by the artist Johann Michael Feuchtmayer, Johann Georg Weckenmann and Andreas Meinrad von Ow.  He supported the canonization of the local saint Fidelis of Sigmaringen.  He also supported the school and church life.

Marriages and Issue 

In Oettingen on 20 May 1722 Joseph married firstly with Maria Franziska Louise (21 May 1703 – 29 November 1737), daughter of Prince Franz Albrecht of Oettingen-Spielberg, who brought him a considerable fortune. They had six children:
 Karl Friedrich (9 January 1724 – 20 December 1785), Prince of Hohenzollern-Sigmaringen.
 Maria Johanna (13 November 1726 – 9 April 1793), a nun in Buchau.
 Maria Amalia Franziska (8 May 1729 – 4 March 1730).
 Meinrad Ferdinand Joseph (20 October 1732 – 8 June 1733).
 Maria Anna Theresia (born and died 16 August 1736).
 A son (born and died 29 November 1737).

On 5 July 1738 Joseph married secondly with Maria Judith Katharina Philippina (30 April 1718 – 9 May 1743), daughter of Count Franz Anton of Closen, Baron of Arnstorf. They had three children:
 Karl Albrecht Joseph (24 March 1741 – 23 May 1741).
 Maria Amalia Josepha (29 May 1742 – 27 August 1742).
 Maria Theresia Philippina (15 April 1743 – 11 August 1743).

On 22 October 1743 Joseph married thirdly with Maria Theresa (3 March 1696 – 7 May 1761), daughter of Count Franz Christoph of Waldburg at Trauchburg. They had no children.

Ancestry

References 
 Günter Schmitt: Sigmaringen, in: Günter Schmitt: Burgenführer Schwäbische Alb, vol.  3: Donautal. Wandern und entdecken zwischen Sigmaringen und Tuttlingen, Biberacher Verlagsdruckerei, Biberach, 1990, p. 41–62
 Gustav Schilling: Geschichte des Hauses Hohenzollern in genealogisch fortlaufenden Biographien aller seiner Regenten von den ältesten bis auf die neuesten Zeiten, nach Urkunden und andern authentischen Quellen, Fleischer, Leipzig 1843, p. 283 ff

Princes of Hohenzollern-Sigmaringen
Counts of Hohenzollern-Haigerloch
House of Hohenzollern
1702 births
1769 deaths
18th-century German people